Peter Minnema better known by his ring name Pete Wilson (born December 15, 1985) is a Canadian professional wrestler. He is best known for his time in Stampede Wrestling where he held several titles, including the Stampede International Tag Team Championship which he held three times.

Early life
Minnema has a sister named Jennifer.

Professional wrestling career
Wilson was trained by the Hart family and debuted in 2001 in Eric Bischoff's MatRats promotion. He also wrestled at Stu Hart's 88th Birthday Celebration show on May 2, 2003.

Stampede Wrestling (2003–2008)
He joined Stampede Wrestling under the ring name "Pistol" Pete Wilson and was billed as the younger brother of TJ Wilson. He later changed his ring name to "Pyro" Pete Wilson and formed a tag team with Phoenix Taylor known as "Fast and Furious". On June 17, 2005, Wilson defeated Gama Singh, Jr. and Dandy Myers in a three-way match to win the vacant British Commonwealth Mid-Heavyweight Championship. On November 4, 2005, Wilson teamed with "Ravenous" Randy Myres to defeat the New Karachi Vice (Singh, Jr. and Tiger Raj Singh) for the International Tag Team Championship, making Wilson a double champion. After successful title defenses against Harry Smith and TJ Wilson, and Dusty Adonis and Blanco Negro Dragon, they lost the titles on December 16, 2005, when Karachi Vice defeated them. After losing the tag team titles, Myres and Wilson split as a team and began feuding throughout March and April 2006. Wilson gained three victories over Myres, including one by disqualification, and one in a tables match. He later dropped the British Commonwealth Mid-Heavyweight Championship to Myres on May 26, 2006, after holding it for nearly a year. On July 28, 2006, Wilson won the International Tag Team Championship for the second time, with Juggernaut, by defeating Duke Durrango and Chris Steele. Wilson, however, received a legitimate injury in November 2006, and could not compete, so TJ Wilson replaced him as one half of the tag team champions.

Wilson returned to Stampede on September 7, 2007, as a heel, defeating Brady Roberts. After the match, he went on a leave of absence, before returning on November 16, 2007, to defeat Scotty "The Body" Putty. He continued to appear in Stampede throughout 2008, losing to Teddy Hart on February 15 at My Bloody Valentine. He also competed against Chucky Blaze, and at Carnage In Acadia on April 26, the match went to a no contest, after Blaze performed his finishing move on Wilson through a table.

Hart Legacy Wrestling
Wilson is part of the Hart Legacy Wrestling promotion. During the "Resurrection" event in 2013 he suffered a shoulder injury and was rushed to the ER.

Canadian Wrestling's Elite
Wilson wrestled for the promotion Canadian Wrestling's Elite during 2016, he performed as a tag-team named Armed & Dangerous with “Dynamite” Dan Myers, they debuted in the main event of CWE's first event in Calgary against “Dungeon Master” Johnny Devine and "Hotshot" Danny Duggan. In August 2017 they had a match together with Matt Hart against Silas Young, Tony Kozina and The Big Chief which was a tribute match to Matt's father Smith Hart who died in July.

Personal life

Minnema is married to Brooke Hart-Minnema, granddaughter of Stu Hart and the daughter of Alison Hart and Ben Bassarab. Minnema and Hart met each other when he was wrestling for her uncles Bruce and Ross Hart's incarnation of Stampede Wrestling. Minnema is a trainer at the Hart family's school, Dungeon Discipline Professional Wrestling School.

Championships and accomplishments
Real Canadian Wrestling
RCW Tag Team Championship (1 time) – with Teddy Hart
Stampede Wrestling
Stampede British Commonwealth Mid-Heavyweight Championship (1 time)
Stampede International Tag Team Championship (3 times) – with Randy Myers (1), Juggernaut (1), and Chris Steele (1)
Stampede Mid-Heavyweight of the Year (2005)

References

External links
 
 Stampede Wrestling profile

1985 births
21st-century professional wrestlers
Canadian male professional wrestlers
Hart family members
Living people
Professional wrestlers from Calgary
Stampede Wrestling alumni
Stampede Wrestling British Commonwealth Mid-Heavyweight Champions
Stampede Wrestling International Tag Team Champions